Sophia Jagiellon of Poland (13 July 1522 – 28 May 1575), a member of the Jagiellonian dynasty, was a Polish princess and Duchess of Brunswick-Wolfenbüttel from 1556 to 1568 by her marriage with Duke Henry V.

Life 

Sophia was born in Kraków, a daughter of King Sigismund I of Poland (1467–1548) and his second wife, the Italian princess Bona Sforza (1494–1557). She was the third of her parents' six children and raised at the royal court of Wawel Castle with her siblings including Isabella Jagiellon, Sigismund II Augustus, Anna Jagiellon, Catherine Jagiellon and Albert Jagiellon.

Duchess of Brunswick-Wolfenbüttel
When in 1548 her mother Bona Sforza entered into conflict with her son King Sigismund II Augustus over the marriage with his mistress Barbara Radziwiłł, Sophia and her sisters were removed from the Kraków court to live in Masovia.

Between 22 and 25 February 1556 she married the 66-year-old Duke Henry V of Brunswick-Wolfenbüttel. The Catholic duke had been a loyal supporter of the Habsburg emperor Charles V in the Schmalkaldic War. He had been firstly married to Princess Mary (died 1541), a daughter of Count Henry of Württemberg. The couple had eight children, though only one surviving son, Prince Julius, whose elder brothers were killed in the 1553 Battle of Sievershausen. His father considered him an incapable ruler and wished for another heir to the throne; however, the second marriage with Sophia proved childless.  She was accompanied to Germany with a retinue of 500 courtiers, among whom Agnieszka (courtier) was to be her influential confidante and favorite.

Widowhood
On 11 June 1568 Sophia was widowed. After the death of her husband she retired to the families residence in Schöningen. Shortly after, she fell into dispute with her stepson Duke Julius of Brunswick-Wolfenbüttel; the conflict, which concerned the scope of princely rule in the Schöningen estates, ended on 17 January 1572 when both signed an agreement. Julius, however, did not honor the terms and in 1573 Sophia had to ask for help from Emperor Maximilian II.

In the spring of 1570 Sophia converted to Lutheranism and therefore was the first and only Protestant member of the Jagiellonian dynasty. She died on 28 May 1575 at Schöningen Castle. She is buried in the Church of the Blessed Virgin Mary in Wolfenbüttel.

Ancestry

References

External links

|-

1522 births
1575 deaths
Polish Lutherans
Nobility from Kraków
Sophia
Polish princesses
Converts to Lutheranism from Roman Catholicism
Sophia
Sophia
16th-century Polish people
16th-century Polish women 
16th-century German people
16th-century German women
Daughters of kings